Foston is a hamlet in the Foston and Scropton civil parish of South Derbyshire, Derbyshire, England, about  west of Derby and  east of Uttoxeter. The Domesday Book of 1086 lists it as Farulveston.

Foston Hall
Foston Hall is a brick Jacobethan house designed by the architect T.C. Hine and built in 1863. It is now a women's prison that can accommodate over 170 inmates. Foston is visible from Sudbury open prison.

Economy and amenities
JCB has a manufacturing plant here concerned with power systems. Other major employers who have a base in Foston include Futaba UK Ltd, ATL Warehousing & Logistics and Truma UK.

Children who live in Foston are likely to go to John Port Spencer Academy.

Notable residents
Arthur Agarde, antiquarian, was born here in 1540.

Road
The A511 terminates in this hamlet, but the A50, passes. The A511 road is useful to the villages of Hatton and Tutbury, and to the town of Burton upon Trent, and to the county of Leicestershire.

See also
 Foston Hall
 List of places in Derbyshire
 Listed buildings in Foston and Scropton

References

External links

Hamlets in Derbyshire
South Derbyshire District